The 2002 Budapest Grand Prix was a women's tennis tournament played on outdoor clay courts in Budapest, Hungary that was part of the Tier V category of the 2002 WTA Tour. It was the eighth edition of the tournament and was held from 15 April until 21 April 2002. Unseeded Martina Müller won the singles title and earned $16,000 first-prize money.

Finals

Singles

 Martina Müller defeated  Myriam Casanova 6–2, 3–6, 6–4
 It was Müller's only singles title of her career.

Doubles

 Catherine Barclay /  Émilie Loit defeated  Elena Bovina /  Zsófia Gubacsi 4–6, 6–3, 6–3

External links
 ITF tournament edition details
 Tournament draws

Colortex Budapest Grand Prix
Budapest Grand Prix
Buda
Buda